Suffocation is the process of Asphyxia. 

Suffocation or Suffocate may also refer to:

 Suffocation (band), an American death metal band
 Suffocation (album), 2006
 "Suffocation", a song on Morbid Angel's debut album, Altars of Madness
 "Suffocation", a song on Obituary's debut album Slowly We Rot
 "Suffocation", a song on Vangelis's album See You Later
 "Suffocate", a song by Finger Eleven from their 2000 album The Greyest of Blue Skies (album)
 "Suffocate", a song by Cold from their 2003 album Year of the Spider
 "Suffocate", a song by Green Day from their 2002 album Shenanigans
 "Suffocate" (Feeder song), a 1998 single by Feeder
 "Suffocate" (J. Holiday song), a 2007 single by J. Holiday
 "Suffocate", a song by Mutiny Within from Mutiny Within
 "Suffocate" (King Adora song), 2001
 "Suffocate", a song by Crossfade from their 2011 album We All Bleed